The Porvenir massacre was an incident on January 28, 1918 outside the village of Porvenir, in Presidio County, Texas, in which Texas Rangers and local ranchers, with the support of U.S. Cavalry, killed 15 unarmed Mexican American boys and men. The Texas Rangers Company B had been sent to the area to stop banditry after the Brite Ranch raid. Despite having no evidence that the Porvenir villagers had been involved in recent thefts or the killings of ranchers, the Rangers separated 15 men and boys from the rest of the village and shot them on a nearby hill.

Background
As the Mexican Revolution had an increasing effect on Americans living near the border, anti-Mexican sentiment became more prevalent in the 1910s. Revolutionaries attacked farms, irrigation systems, and railroads. After Pancho Villa's Villistas led raids into the United States, most notably in the Battle of Columbus in 1916, federal, state, and local authorities took greater action to stop raids in the border region. Many Texas Rangers, including Company B, were ordered to secure the areas near the border and to stop raids by bandits, Villistas, and Anglo-Americans trying to provoke conflict with Mexico.

Another factor that increased anti-Mexican sentiment was the emergence of the Plan de San Diego in 1915. The Plan de San Diego was a manifesto made by two Texas Mexicans in an attempt to create an uprising against Anglo-American settlers in the lands acquired by the US after the Treaty of Guadalupe-Hidalgo following the Mexican-American War. Although unsuccessful, this plan spurred fears of more violence in the border states, in addition to banditry and the encroaching Mexican civil war.

The Brite Ranch raid took place on Christmas Day, December 25, 1917, in Presidio County. The mail hack driver was hanged in the store, and his throat was slit. His two Mexican passengers were shot and killed, and the ranch foreman was injured. The bandits stole thousands of dollars worth of goods from the store and horses before they fled toward Mexico. The U.S. Cavalry responded by chasing the suspected Villistas into Mexico.

Incident
On January 26, 1918, Texas Rangers Company B, under the command of Captain James Monroe Fox, entered and searched the homes of villagers in Porvenir after suspecting involvement in the Brite Ranch raid a month before. During the search, the Rangers found only two weapons: a pistol belonging to an Anglo-American man in the village, and a Winchester rifle belonging to a Tejano villager. Both weapons were confiscated, and three Tejano men were arrested and taken and detained at the Ranger camp. The men were released the next day. Shortly after two of the men returned to Porvenir, the Rangers reentered the settlement in the early hours of January 28, taking everyone out of their homes. In addition to the ten Rangers, eight U.S. Army Cavalry, and four local Anglo-American ranchers (John Pool, Buck Pool, Raymond Fitzgerald and Tom Snyder) were present at the village.

A total of 15 males, two boys and the remainder men, all ethnic Mexicans, were separated from the women, other children, and Anglo-Americans in the village. The Texas Rangers and ranchers led the men and boys outside the village to a nearby hill, reportedly leaving the U.S. Army Cavalry soldiers closer to the village. Shortly after, the party of Rangers and ranchers shot and killed all fifteen men and boys.

They left the bodies of the dead where they were shot. The next day, the son of one of the men killed, 13-year old Juan Flores, went with Anglo-American schoolteacher Henry Warren to the site and discovered the massacre. The remaining 140 villagers abandoned Porvenir. Many moved across the border to Pilares, Chihuahua, where they buried the deceased. The uninhabited village was razed by U.S. Army soldiers in the days following the massacre.

Victims
The list of victims was documented by Porvenir schoolteacher Henry Warren.
 Manuel Moralez, 47, who possessed a deed to 1,600 acres. His sixth child was born that night.
 Román Nieves, 48, who possessed a deed to 320 acres
 Longino Flores, 44, father of Juan Flores
 Alberto García, 35
 Eutimio Gonzales, 37
 Macedonio Huertas, 30
 Tiburcio Jaques, 50
 Ambrosio Hernández, 21
 Antonio Castanedo, 72
 Pedro Herrera, 25
 Viviano Herrera, 23
 Severiano Herrera, 15
 Pedro Jiménez, 25
 Serapio Jiménez, 25
 Juan Jiménez, 16

The men killed were survived by a combined forty-two children.

Aftermath
The incident was not reported to Ranger command for nearly a month. Captain Fox of the Rangers reported that the 15 Mexican villagers had ambushed the Rangers, and that stolen property from the Brite Ranch was found on the bodies of the villagers. Captain Anderson of the U.S. Cavalry and Henry Warren gave a differing account of the massacre, stating the Rangers and ranchers had executed the men, and that the U.S. Cavalry was not involved in the killings.

It is largely unknown whether retaliatory action against Anglo-Americans by Mexicans occurred following the Porvenir massacre. One instance of possible retaliation was the Neville Ranch raid. On March 25, two months after the Porvenir massacre, a rancher and a female Mexican servant were killed by raiders at nearby Neville Ranch. The servant was raped, shot, and mutilated. As not much was stolen during the raid, it was suspected that the Neville Ranch killings were retaliation by Villistas for the Porvenir massacre.

Investigations
An investigation was launched by the Texas Rangers Command and headed by Captain William M. Hanson. The investigation used affidavits from several widows of the victims, all having Henry Warren as their attorney. Along with a statement from Warren claiming the dead were all farmers, and none bandits, the investigation concluded that Company B was to be tried for the killings. None of the Rangers was found guilty by a grand jury, but five were dismissed by Texas Governor William P. Hobby. The remainder, including Captain Fox, were reassigned. Company B was disbanded. The investigation concluded that the U.S. Cavalry were not directly involved in the killings.

The Porvenir Ranger investigation was concluded in June 1918, shortly before Texas State Representative José Tomás Canales launched a broader investigation into misconduct by the Rangers throughout Texas. The 1919 joint Senate-House investigation concluded that the Texas Rangers had committed many atrocities and extrajudicial killings, particularly of ethnic Mexicans. The investigation estimated that from 1914 to 1919, between 300 and 5,000 ethnic Mexicans died in the violence. Charges were filed against many Rangers and the department was reduced in size. Additionally, Canales required administrative changes within the Texas Ranger Division, including much stricter recruitment criteria and higher pay for qualifying Rangers. The investigation largely ended the mass violence by law enforcement against Mexicans and instituted a new level of professionalism within the Rangers.

Archaeological investigation
In 2015 archaeological research at the site of the killings turned up bullets and casings likely to have been fired by U.S. Cavalry standard-issue weapons. In 2002, Juan Flores identified the site where his father and 14 others were killed. One of the team's archaeologists, David Keller, said, "I can say with a fair degree of confidence that the artifactual distribution, the types of artifacts, all strongly conform to the hypothesis that this was the site of the Porvenir Massacre of 1918. The findings also strongly implicate the U.S. Cavalry."

Representation in other media
Texas-based film filmmaker Andrew Shapter produced and directed Porvenir, Texas, a feature-length documentary film about the massacre. It features new and archival footage of interviews and archaeological digs. It was scheduled to be shown on PBS in March 2018.

Shapter also began production in mid-2018 as director of Porvenir, a feature-length historical drama about the massacre.

Legacy and historical marker
Descendants of the victims of the massacre set up an organization. In 2018, they gathered for ceremonies in San Antonio and Austin to commemorate the 100th anniversary of the massacre. There was widespread media coverage marking the anniversary.

On November 30, 2018, the state placed an historical highway marker 27 miles west of Marfa on Highway 90 to commemorate the Porvenir Massacre. It was installed under the Texas Historical Commission's Undertold Stories Marker Program.

See also

Anti-Mexican sentiment
Institutional racism#Lynching of people of Mexican descent

References

Further reading 
 Carrigan, W. D., & Webb, C. (2013). Forgotten Dead: Mob Violence against Mexicans in the United States, 1848-1928. Oxford: Oxford University Press.
 Keil, R., & McBride, E. (2002). Bosque Bonito: Violent times along the borderland during the Mexican Revolution. Alpine, TX: Sul Ross State University, Center for Big Bend Studies.
 Levario, M. A. (2012). Militarizing the Border: When Mexicans Became the Enemy. College Station, TX: Texas A & M University Press.
 Martinez, M. M. (2018).The Injustice Never Leaves You: Anti-Mexican Violence in Texas Cambridge, MA: Harvard University Press. 
 Villanueva, N. (2017). The Lynching of Mexicans in the Texas Borderlands. Albuquerque, NM: University of New Mexico Press.

External links

Daniel Blue Tyx, The Texas Observer: Who Writes History? The Fight to Commemorate a Massacre by the Texas Rangers

1918 in Texas
Mass murder in 1918
Massacres in 1918
20th-century military history of the United States
History of Texas
January 1918 events
Mass murder in Texas
Mass murder in the United States
Massacres of men
Massacres in the United States
Presidio County, Texas
Racially motivated violence against Hispanic and Latino Americans
Texas Ranger Division
United States home front during World War I
Violence against men in North America
Tejano
Massacres committed by the United States